The Nga'ka language, or Munga'ka, also known as Bali, is a Grassfields language spoken by the people of Bali Nyonga in Cameroon. They are the descendants of the Chamba of northern Nigeria.

Phonology 
The sounds of Munga'ka are as follows:

Consonant inventory

Vowel inventory

References 

Languages of Cameroon
Nun languages